Mask Girl is an upcoming South Korean streaming television series directed by Kim Yong-hoon, starring Go Hyun-jung, Ahn Jae-hong, and Yeom Hye-ran. It is scheduled to be released in 2023.

Synopsis 
The series based on the Naver Webtoon of the same name, it tells the story of an ordinary office worker with an appearance complex who gets caught up in an unintended incident while working as an internet BJ while covering her face with a mask every night.

Cast 
 Go Hyun-jung as Kim Mo-mi
 Nana as Kim Mo-mi (after surgery)
 Ahn Jae-hong as Joo Oh-nam
 Yeom Hye-ran as Kim Kyung-ja
 Choi Daniel

Special appearance 
 Lee Jun-young

References

External links 
 
 

Korean-language Netflix original programming
South Korean drama web series
Upcoming Netflix original programming
Upcoming television series
2023 web series debuts
2023 South Korean television series debuts
South Korean web series
Television series about social media